Seattle Bible College (SBC) is a four-year Bible college in Everett, Washington that offers theological and church ministry degrees. It was founded in 1955 and is associated with Philadelphia Church in Seattle, Washington which is associated with the Fellowship of Christian Assemblies.

History
During the summer of 2006, SBC relocated 20 miles north of its original Seattle, which was adjacent to the Philadelphia Church location to Sonrise Chapel in south Everett. In 2007 a graduate studies division of SBC was established – Cross-National Graduate School of Leadership.

In 2009, SBC relocated again to the Mill Creek campus of Christian Faith Center co-pastored by televangelists Casey and Wendy Treat, and a “blending” process began with Vision College, a training ministry of Christian Faith Center.

In 2010, Vision College became a “vocational studies division” of Seattle Bible College, and Pastor Casey Treat was confirmed as President of Seattle Bible College, Inc. As of fall quarter, 2011, SBC blended with Vision College. In June 2013, Pastor Treat, whom, along with wife Wendy, are alumumi of the college, resigned as SBC President, and during the summer of 2013, SBC relocated to its present Sonrise Christian Center in Everett.

Dr. Dan Hammer presently serves as SBC President. In 2014 the church's one-year training ministry transitioned into becoming a program track of Seattle Bible College.

References

External links
www.seattlebiblecollege.edu

1955 establishments in Oregon
Bible colleges
Educational institutions established in 1955
Unaccredited Christian universities and colleges in the United States
Seminaries and theological colleges in Washington (state)